The 1966 South Carolina Gamecocks football team represented the University of South Carolina as a member of the Atlantic Coast Conference (ACC) during the 1966 NCAA University Division football season. Led by first-year head coach Paul Dietzel, the Gamecocks compiled an overall record of 1–9 with a mark of 1–3 in conference play, placing seventh in the ACC. The team played home games at Carolina Stadium in Columbia, South Carolina.

Dietzel, who had coached LSU to a national championship in 1958 and Southeastern Conference (SEC) titles in 1958 and  1961, became South Carolina's coach after four seasons at Army. Dietzel's first game leading the Gamecocks was against LSU Tigers at Baton Rouge, Louisiana. The Tigers won, 28–12.

In South Carolina's only win of the season, against NC State, defensive back and team captain Bobby Bryant returned a punt 98 yards for a touchdown, setting a program record for longest punt return.

Schedule

References

South Carolina
South Carolina Gamecocks football seasons
South Carolina Gamecocks football